War and Peace in the Nuclear Age is a 1989 PBS television series focusing on the effect of nuclear weapons development on international relations and warfare during the Cold War. The 13-part series was funded by the Annenberg/CPB Project and produced by WGBH in Boston in association with NHK and Central Independent Television. The New York Times called it "public television's equivalent of a nuclear explosion," praising it as "intelligently conceived and fastidiously balanced."

External links 
 UC Berkeley Video Library review
 TIME Magazine review
 New York Times review
 War and Peace in the Nuclear Age on WGBH's Open Vault website

PBS original programming
Television series by WGBH
1980s American documentary television series
1989 American television series debuts